Moacyr Grechi (19 January 1936 – 17 June 2019) was a Brazilian Roman Catholic archbishop.

Career 
Grechi was born in Brazil and was ordained to the priesthood in 1961. He served as bishop-prelate of the Territorial Prelature of Acre and Purus from 1972 to 1986. In 1986, the territorial prelature was elevated to the Roman Catholic Diocese of Rio Branco, Brazil, and Grechi served as the first bishop of the diocese from 1986 to 1998. He then served as the archbishop of the Roman Catholic Archdiocese of Porto Velho, Brazil, from 1998 to 2011.

Notes

1936 births
2019 deaths
21st-century Roman Catholic archbishops in Brazil
20th-century Roman Catholic archbishops in Brazil
Roman Catholic archbishops of Porto Velho
Roman Catholic bishops of Rio Branco